Waves is a song by Mono Band from the album Mono Band, and was released in May 2005. This is the first song to be released in a physical format while "release" and "invitation" were previously offered on iTunes.

Track listing
"Waves (radio edit)"
"Brighter Sky (Steve Hillier version)"

Personnel
Noel Hogan – guitars, programming
Richard Walters – lead vocals (1)
Soname Yangchen – lead vocals (2)
Marius De Vries – keyboards, programming (2)
Fergal Lawler - drums (1)

References

2005 singles
Irish rock songs
Songs written by Noel Hogan
2005 songs